Massachusetts House of Representatives' 35th Middlesex district in the United States is one of 160 legislative districts included in the lower house of the Massachusetts General Court. It covers parts of the cities of Malden and Medford in Middlesex County. Since 2003, Paul J. Donato Sr. of the Democratic Party has represented the district. Candidates running for this district seat in the 2020 Massachusetts general election include Nichole Mossalam.

The current district geographic boundary overlaps with those of the Massachusetts Senate's 2nd Middlesex and 5th Middlesex districts.

Representatives
 George W. Shattuck, circa 1973 
 Lincoln P. Cole Jr., 1975-1978
 Sherman W. Saltmarsh Jr.
 William G. Robinson 
 Timothy F. O'Leary 
 Patrick C. Guerriero
 Michael E. Festa
 Paul J. Donato Sr., 2003-current

See also
 List of Massachusetts House of Representatives elections
 List of Massachusetts General Courts
 Other Middlesex County districts of the Massachusetts House of Representatives: 1st, 2nd, 3rd, 4th, 5th, 6th, 7th, 8th, 9th, 10th, 11th, 12th, 13th, 14th, 15th, 16th, 17th, 18th, 19th, 20th, 21st, 22nd, 23rd, 24th, 25th, 26th, 27th, 28th, 29th, 30th, 31st, 32nd, 33rd, 34th, 36th, 37th
 List of former districts of the Massachusetts House of Representatives

Images
Portraits of legislators

References

External links
 Ballotpedia
  (State House district information based on U.S. Census Bureau's American Community Survey).

House
Government of Middlesex County, Massachusetts